Sante Cattaneo or Santo Cattaneo (8 August 1739 – 1819) was an Italian painter of the Neoclassic period, mainly active in Brescia.

He was also called Santino. He was born at Salò, Italy. His parents traveled away and consigned him at age three to thirteen to his aunt. He then moved to Brescia to live with his mother, who worked in wool looms. He at first practised wood-engraving, but afterwards studied painting under Antonio Dusi of Brescia and then, with Francesco Monti (Bologna). He studied in 1776 at the Accademia Clementina of Bologna. He settled at Brescia in 1773, and in 1810 became professor of drawing in the Art academy of that city. He died in Brescia. Among Cattaneo's pupils are Domenico Vantini, Luigi Basiletti, Antonio Manenti, and Carlo Frigerio. Professor Romualdo Turini of Salò was a pupil and his biographer.

Works
 Altarpiece for parish church of San Vincenzo Diacono in Calcinato.
 Crucifixion of Apostole Peter (1783) altarpiece in presbytery of church of Santi Pietro e Paolo in Verolavecchia.
 Last Supper, canvas in church of San Sebastiano in Pavone.
 Martyrdoms of Saints Andrew and Flavianus for parish church of Sant'Andrea in Pralboino.
 Assumption of the Virgin with Saints Peter and Imerius, altarpiece for parish church of Santi Pietro e Paolo in Offlaga.
 La Riviera thanks the provveditore Marco Soranzo, (1786) for palazzo comunale di Salò
 Deposition (1808), church of Santi Faustino e Giovita, Brescia.
 Madonna and child with Saints Catherine and Angela Merici, (after 1815) for church of Santa Maria degli Angeli, Brescia.
 Saints Benedict and Scolastica, Jesus distributes Eucharist and other frescos for Sant'Afra, Brescia.
 Visitation of Mary to St Elisabeth, church of Santa Maria ad Elisabetta, Brescia.

References

1739 births
1819 deaths
18th-century Italian painters
Italian male painters
19th-century Italian painters
Painters from Brescia
People from Salò
Italian neoclassical painters
19th-century Italian male artists
18th-century Italian male artists